Fredericus Jacobus Rutten (born 5 December 1962) is a Dutch football coach and former player. As a player, he spent his entire career with Twente during the years 1979 to 1992. Following his playing career, Rutten also managed Twente, before moving on to clubs like Schalke 04, PSV Eindhoven, Vitesse Arnhem, Feyenoord, Al Shabab, Maccabi Haifa and more recently Anderlecht.

Coaching career
Rutten has managed Twente (assistant manager, manager and technical director) and PSV Eindhoven (youth coach and assistant manager). In the summer of 2008, he took over as head coach of Bundesliga club Schalke 04. On 26 March 2009, Rutten was sacked as Schalke manager.

On 17 April 2009, Rutten signed a contract as the new manager of PSV Eindhoven, for the season 2009–10. During the 2009–10 competition Rutten's side remained undefeated for 39 consecutive games. On 12 March 2012 Rutten was sacked as PSV manager following losses to Twente (2–6) and NAC (3–1) in the Eredivisie and to Valencia (4–2) in the Europa League.

The following season Rutten served as head coach of Vitesse Arnhem where John van den Brom had been head coach before moving to Belgian side R.S.C. Anderlecht. Rutten left Vitesse Arnhem after the 2012-13 Eredivisie season, finishing in 4th place. On 3 March 2014, Feyenoord released a statement confirming they had hired Rutten as their new head coach for the 2014-15 Eredivisie season. On 2 March 2015, Feyenoord announced that Rutten had decided not to extend his one-year contract, meaning he would leave the club at the end of the season. 
Feyenoord reached the knockout stage of the Europa League for the first time since 2004 with Rutten as head coach. On 17 May 2015, Feyenoord fired Rutten as head coach effective immediately after a 3-0 loss against PEC Zwolle, causing Feyenoord to finish 4th in the Eredivisie and missing out on directly qualifying for the Europa League.

Rutten then had brief spells in the Middle East at Al Shabab and Maccabi Haifa. On 6 January 2019 he became head coach of R.S.C. Anderlecht. However, on 16 April he was already fired after only 13 matches.

On May 20, 2022, PSV confirmed that Rutten would return for the 2022-23 season as an assistant under head coach Ruud van Nistelrooy.

Honours

Manager
Club
 KNVB Cup: 2001

Individual
 Rinus Michels Award: 2008

Managerial statistics

References

External links
Fred Rutten at Goal.com

1962 births
Living people
People from Wijchen
Footballers from Gelderland
Dutch football managers
Association football defenders
Dutch footballers
Netherlands international footballers
Eredivisie players
FC Twente players
Eredivisie managers
FC Twente managers
FC Schalke 04 managers
PSV Eindhoven managers
Bundesliga managers
SBV Vitesse managers
Feyenoord managers
Dutch expatriate football managers
Rinus Michels Award winners
FC Twente non-playing staff
UAE Pro League managers
Israeli Premier League managers
Expatriate football managers in Germany
Expatriate football managers in Belgium
Expatriate football managers in Israel
Expatriate football managers in the United Arab Emirates
Dutch expatriate sportspeople in Israel
Dutch expatriate sportspeople in Belgium
Dutch expatriate sportspeople in Germany
Dutch expatriate sportspeople in the United Arab Emirates